This is a summary of the electoral history of Ali Larijani, an Iranian Principlist politician who is a member and Speaker of Islamic Consultative Assembly since 2008.

Ministry approval 
Khatami was nominated and approved for Ministry of Culture and Islamic Guidance by Iranian Parliament.

Parliament elections

2008 

He was elected to the Parliament representing Qom with 239,436 (73.01%) votes. He was ranked 1st in the constituency.

2012 

He was elected to the Parliament representing Qom with 270,382 (65.17%) votes. He was ranked 1st in the constituency.

Speaker of the Parliament elections 
He was elected as Speaker of the Parliament of Iran in 2 consecutive terms.

Presidential election

2005 

In the first round, Ali Larijani finished sixth with 1,713,810 votes (5.83%) and did not advance to the second round.

References 

Electoral history of Iranian politicians